The standing long jump, also known as the standing broad jump, is an athletics event. It was an Olympic event until 1912. It is one of three standing variants of track and field jumping events, which also include the standing high jump and standing triple jump.

In performing the standing long jump, the jumper stands at a line marked on the ground with the feet slightly apart. The athlete takes off and lands using both feet, swinging the arms and bending the knees to provide forward drive. In Olympic rules, the measurement used was the longest of three tries. The jump must be repeated if the athlete falls back or takes a step at take-off.

When indoor arenas were built, the standing long jump began to disappear as an event. Today, Norway is the only country where the standing long jump is a national championship event. The Norwegian Championships in Standing Jumps (long jump and high jump) has been held in Stange every winter since 1995.

The standing long jump is also one of the events at the NFL combine, it was one of the standardized test events as part of the President's Award on Physical Fitness, as well as the physical fitness test that officer cadets must complete at the Royal Military College of Canada and the United States Air Force Academy. In the Brazilian police forces, a minimum performance in a standing long jump test is required to join the Federal Police (2.14 m for men 1.66 m for women) and the Federal Highway Police (2.00 m for men 1.60 m for women).

Olympic medalists

Intercalated Games

References

Events in track and field
Long jump
Discontinued Summer Olympic disciplines in athletics